Sardab Rud (also Romanized as Sardāb Rūd, Sardab Rūd, and Sard Abrood) is a village in Kelarestaq-e Gharbi Rural District, in the Central District of Chalus County, Mazandaran Province, Iran. At the 2006 census, its population was 549, in 164 families.

References 

Populated places in Chalus County